Grand Rabbi Yehoshua Rokeach (born 1949), the current Machnovka Rebbe of Bnei Brak, is a great-nephew of Rabbi Avraham Yehoshua Heshl of Machnovka, the third Machnovker Rebbe.

As a scion of the Belz dynasty
The lineage of the present Machnovker Rebbe from the Belz dynasty is as follows:

Grand Rabbi Shalom Rokeach, author of Sar Shalom, the first Belzer Rebbe, a disciple of the Seer of Lublin
Grand Rabbi Yehoshua Rokeach, son of the Sar Shalom, second Belzer Rebbe
Grand Rabbi Yissachar Dov Rokeach, son of Rabbi Yehoshua, the third Belzer Rebbe. He first married Basia Rochma, daughter of Rabbi Yeshaya Meshullam Zusya Twersky. Then he married Chaya Devora of the Pychenik family of Berezna. The Belz connection with Chernobyl was strong. Rabbi Issachar, though a Belzer Rebbe, was known as the “illui (prodigy) of Chernobyl,” where he lived for ten years. Rabbi Issachar's five daughters all married into the Chernobyl dynasty.
Grand Rabbi Yehoshua Rokeach of Jaroslaw, son of Rabbi Issachar Dov of Belz (with his second wife). Rabbi Yehoshua married and then divorced Chana, daughter of the first Machnovker Rebbe, Yosef Meyer Twersky
 Rabbi Isaac David Rokeach, son of Rebbe Yehoshua and Chana above.
 Grand Rabbi Yehoshua Rokeach, (born in Tel Aviv, 1949) of Machnovka-Bnei Brak is the son of Rabbi Isaac David Rokeach, son of Chana Zosha above. He succeeded his great-uncle Rebbe Avraham Yehoshua Heshl Twersky as Machnovker Rebbe. He is the fourth and present Machnovker Rebbe.

Bibliography
 Grand Rabbis of Chernobyl (in Hebrew and English; Hebrew title: Admorei Malchus Beis Chernobyl), Flushing and Lakewood, New York: Genealogy Research Center of the Twersky Chernobyl Dynasty and the Makarov-Chernobyl Foundation, 2003.
 Rabinowicz, Tzvi M. (ed.). The Encyclopedia of Hasidism. Northvale, NJ: Jason Aronson Inc., 1996.
 Rosenstein, Neil. The Unbroken Chain: Biographical Sketches and Genealogy of Illustrious Jewish Families from the 15th-20th Century, rev. ed. (2 vols.). New York, NY: CIS Publishers, 1990.

References

Chernobyl (Hasidic dynasty)
Hasidic rabbis in Israel
Hasidic rebbes
Descendants of the Baal Shem Tov
1949 births
Living people